Chrysalis School  is a private school in Woodinville, Washington, teaching grades K–12.

Notable alumni
Megan Hilty, actress
Phoenix Jones, member of Rain City Superhero Movement
Brett McClure, Silver Medalist in gymnastics in the 2004 Olympics
Yina Moe-Lange, alpine ski racer in the 2010 Winter Olympics
Christian Niccum, luger in the 2006 and 2010 Winter Olympics

External links
Chrysalis School

Private elementary schools in Washington (state)
Private high schools in Washington (state)
Schools in Woodinville, Washington
Educational institutions established in 1983
1983 establishments in Washington (state)